İngiloy Kötüklü (also, Ingiloy Këtyuklyu) is a village and municipality in the Qakh Rayon of Azerbaijan.  It has a population of 721.

References 

Populated places in Qakh District